The Northwestern Connecticut Transit District is an agency that provides local service in Litchfield County, Connecticut. It provides local bus service in Torrington, Winsted and Litchfield, Monday through Saturday. The system, named The Candystriper Bus System, operates four regular routes and one Saturday-only route. It is operated directly by the District after the failure of their contractor, Kelley Transit. It also offers dial-a-ride service.

Bus routes

Route 1 
Route 1 is a route serving Winsted, which includes stops at Northwestern Connecticut Community College and other stops in the community.

Route 2 
Route 2 serves the town of Litchfield, but also includes stops at the Charlotte Hungerford Hospital in neighboring Torrington.

Route 3 
Route 3 serves the city of Torrington.

Route 5 
Route 5 serves the city of Torrington, and also includes stops at the Charlotte Hungerford Hospital.

Saturday Torrington Candystriper 
The district also operates a Saturday-only route in the city of Torrington.

References

External links
 Official website

Transportation in Litchfield County, Connecticut
Bus transportation in Connecticut